"Reasons I Drink" is a song by Canadian-American singer Alanis Morissette from her ninth studio album, Such Pretty Forks in the Road (2020). It was released as the lead single from the album on December 2, 2019, through Epiphany Records.

Live performances 
Morissette performed the song for the first time live at the Tonight Show Starring Jimmy Fallon on December 5, 2019.

Charts

References 

2019 singles
2019 songs
Alanis Morissette songs
Songs about alcohol
Songs written by Alanis Morissette